The Havana Water Tower is a historic water tower which stands in Havana, Illinois. Built in 1889 and designed by F. William Raider, it holds 50,000 gallons and was the town's only water supply until 1962. It was designated an American Water Landmark by the American Water Works Association in 1982 and was listed on the National Register of Historic Places in 1993. It still operates today.

See also
List of Towers
American Water Landmark

References

External links
Historic Water Tower

Buildings and structures in Mason County, Illinois
Water towers in Illinois
Towers completed in 1889
National Register of Historic Places in Mason County, Illinois
Water towers on the National Register of Historic Places in Illinois